The following is a timeline of the history of the city of Johannesburg, in the Gauteng province of South Africa.

19th century

 1886 – Johannesburg township established by Boer government after discovery of gold in vicinity.
 1887
 The Star newspaper in publication.
 St. Mary's Church built.
 Johannesburg Stock Exchange founded.
 Theatre Royal opens.
 1888 – St Mary's School was founded.
 1890 
 Library opens.
 Jeppe High School for Boys was founded.
 1891
 Horse-drawn tram begins operating.
 Standard Theatre opens.
 1892 – Prison built.
 1895 – Railway in operation.
 1896
 January: Uprising against Boer government.
 19 February: Braamfontein Explosion.
 1897
 Johannesburg Park station opens.
 Johan Zulch de Villiers becomes the first mayor.
 1898 – St John's College was founded.
 1899 – Fort built.
 1900 – 31 May: Town captured by British forces during the Second Boer War.

20th century

1900s-1950s
 1902 
 King Edward VII School was founded.
 St. Andrew's School for Girls was founded.
 1903
 Johannesburg Stock Exchange building constructed.
 Observatory built near town.
 Sophiatown developed.
 Roedean School for Girls was founded. 
 1904
 Johannesburg Zoo and Transvaal Technical Institute established.
 April: Brickfields burned.
 Drill Hall built.
 Population: 99,022.
 1905
 Town administrative wards created.
 Johannesburg Statistics begins publication.
 Alexandra developed near Johannesburg.
 1906
 Electric trams begin operating.
 Sunday Times newspaper begins publication.
 Meeting of the Municipal Associations of South Africa held in Johannesburg.
 1907 – Redhill School was founded. 
 1908 – Population: 180,687.
 1919 – Jeppe High School for Girls was founded.
 1920 – Parktown Boys' High School was founded. 
 1921 – Helpmekaar Kollege was founded. 
 1922
 University of the Witwatersrand incorporated.
 January–March: Miner's strike.
 1923 – Parktown High School for Girls was founded.
 1925 – Technikon Witwatersrand established.
 1927 – Johannesburg Symphony Orchestra founded. 
 1928 
 Johannesburg gains city status.
 Ellis Park Stadium was opened. 
 1929 – South African Institute of Race Relations headquartered in city.
 1931 – Airport opens in Germiston.
 1933 – Kingsmead College was founded. 
 1935 – Johannesburg City Library building opens.
 1936 – 15 September: The Empire Exhibition, South Africa World's Fair opens
 1937 – 15 January: The Empire Exhibition, South Africa closes.
 1941 – St David's Marist, Inanda was founded. 
 1942 –  Fighting Talk begins publication.
 1944 – Hoërskool Florida was founded.
 1946 – Population: 603,470 city; 762,910 urban agglomeration.
 1948 – Polly Street Centre founded.
 1950 – Springbok Radio begins broadcasting.
 1951
 Drum magazine begins publication.
 Population: 631,911 city; 884,007 urban agglomeration.
 Waverley High School for Girls was founded. 
 1952 – Jan Smuts Airport established in Kempton Park.
 1953 – St Stithians College was founded.
 1956
 December: Treason Trial begins.
 Purple Renoster literary magazine begins publication.
 1957 – 1957 Alexandra Bus Boycott.
 1958 – St Benedict's College was founded.

1960s-1990s
 1960 
 21 March: Sharpeville massacre.
 Johannesburg Planetarium opens.
 1961 
 City becomes part of the Republic of South Africa.
 Greenside High School was founded. 
 1962 – Sentech Tower built.
 1963 
 11 July: The arrest of Umkhonto we Sizwe high commanders known as Rivonia Trialist.
 11 August: Four of the defendants who had been arrested on July 11, at the Liliesleaf Farm near Johannesburg, were able to escape their South African jail after a bribe was promised to their guard by the ANC.
 Classic magazine begins publication.
 1964
 July: The arrest of Umkhonto we Sizwe high commanders known as Little Rivonia Trialist.
 Johannesburg Botanical Garden established.
 1966 – Rand Afrikaans University founded.
 1968 – Bryanston High School was founded.
 1969 
 Hyde Park Corner (shopping centre) in business.
 Northcliff High School was founded.
 1970
 Tollman Towers and Trust Bank Building constructed.
 Population: 654,682 city; 1,432,643 urban agglomeration.
 1971 – Hillbrow Tower built.
 1973 – Marble Towers, Carlton Centre, and Sandton City shopping centre built.
 1974 – Beeld newspaper begins publication.
 1975 – Ponte City Apartments built.
 1976
 16 June: Soweto uprising.
 Market Theatre opens.
 1978 – Staffrider literary magazine begins publication.
 1980
 Municipal workers' strike.
 Federated Union of Black Artists Academy established.
 1981 – The Sowetan newspaper begins publication.
 1982
 City Press newspaper begins publication.
 Afrapix active.
 1984
 3 September: Sharpeville Six
11 Diagonal Street built.
 1985
 Weekly Mail newspaper begins publication.
 Mormon Temple dedicated.
 Population: 632,369 city; 1,609,408 urban agglomeration.
 1987 – Water Institute of Southern Africa headquartered in city.
 1988 – 31 August: Bombing of Khotso House.
 1989
 Soccer City stadium opens.
 Centre for the Study of Violence and Reconciliation established.
 1991 – Population: 712,507 city; 1,916,061 metro.
 1992
 Johannesburg Stadium opens.
 Centre for Policy Studies headquartered in Johannesburg.
 1994
 28 March: Shooting at Shell House.
 City becomes seat of the new Gauteng province.
 South African School of Motion Picture Medium and Live Performance established.
 1995
 Gallagher Convention Centre opens.
 Centre for Development and Enterprise headquartered in Johannesburg.
 Johannesburg Biennale art exhibit begins.
 1996 
 3 February: 1996 Africa Cup of Nations Final football contest played in Johannesburg.
 Population: 752,349 city.
 1997
 MTN Sundrome opens.
 Flag of Johannesburg revised design adopted.
 1998 – Website Joburg.org.za launched.
 1998 – St Peter's College was founded.
 1999 – September: 1999 All-Africa Games held in city.
 2000
 City of Johannesburg Metropolitan Municipality and Johannesburg City Parks created.
 Stoned Cherrie in business.
 Beaulieu College was founded.
 Population: 2,732,000 (urban agglomeration).

21st century

2000s
 2001
 Amos Masondo becomes mayor.
 Monash University, South Africa campus established.
 Population: 3,226,055.
 2002
 Soweto becomes part of city.
 City hosts Earth Summit 2002.
 2003 – Nelson Mandela Bridge built.
 2004
 Constitutional Court of South Africa building opens in Constitution Hill.
 Drill Hall rebuilt.
 Creative Commons South Africa headquartered at University of the Witwatersrand.
 2005
 University of Johannesburg established.
 2 July: Live 8 concert.
 Population: 3,272,000 (urban agglomeration).
 2008
 Joburg Art Fair begins.
 Google office in business.
 Species Australopithecus sediba discovered near Johannesburg.
 2009
 28 June: 2009 FIFA Confederations Cup Final football contest played in Johannesburg.

2010s
 2010 – 11 July: 2010 FIFA World Cup Final held.
 2011
 Parks Tau becomes mayor.
 Air pollution in Johannesburg reaches annual mean of 41 PM2.5 and 85 PM10, more than recommended.
 Population: 4,434,827.
 2013 
 10 February: 2013 Africa Cup of Nations Final football contest played in Johannesburg.
 5 December: Nelson Mandela dies in Johannesburg.
 2015 – October: #FeesMustFall protest.
 2016 – 22 August: Herman Mashaba becomes mayor
 2016 – Mduduzi Edmund Tshabalala died in Johannesburg
 2016 – October: #FeesMustFall protest revival.
 2018 – Winnie Madikizela-Mandela died in Johannesburg.
 2018 – International 10th BRICS summit held at Sandton Convention Centre.
 2018 – 24 October: Jabulani Tsambo died in Johannesburg
 2021
 9 July 2021: Geoff Makhubo dies.
 10 August 2021: Jolidee Matongo becomes mayor.
 18 September 2021: Jolidee Matongo dies from a car accident

See also
 History of Johannesburg
 Mayor of Johannesburg
 City of Johannesburg Metropolitan Municipality
 Timelines of other cities in South Africa: Cape Town, Durban, Pietermaritzburg, Port Elizabeth, Pretoria

References

Bibliography

Published in 20th century
 
 
 
 
 
 Musiker, 2000. A Concise Historical Dictionary of Greater Johannesburg, Francolin Pubs., Cape Town, South Africa.

Published in 21st century
2000s
 
 
 
  + website
 
 
 
 
 
 
 
 
 
 
  (about Cape Town, Johannesburg, Libreville, Lomé)
 
 
 
 

2010s

External links

 
  (Directory of South African archival and memory institutions and organisations)
  (Bibliography of open access  articles)
  (Images, etc.)
  (Images, etc.)
  (Bibliography)
  (Bibliography)
  (Bibliography)
 

 
Johannesburg
Johannesburg
Johannesburg-related lists